Information Global Service (IGS) is a Japanese video game publisher and developer that was active mostly during the early 1990s. The company also operated a US division named Information Global Services Inc. in Pasadena, California.

Games

Game Boy
Astro Rabby
Vattle Giuce
World Beach Volley: 1991 GB Cup (Sequel to World Beach Volley. Published by IGS in Japan, published by Taito in Europe, US version titled Beach Volley was to be published by Taito but it was cancelled)
J-League Fighting Soccer
Armadillo Gaiden (unreleased, became Ultraman Ball)
Ultraman Ball

Famicom/NES
Armadillo (developed by AIM)
Armadillo 2 (unreleased)
Battle Stadium: Senbatsu Pro Yakyuu
J-League Fighting Soccer
Puzznic (published by Taito internationally, port of an arcade game by Taito)
Robocco Wars
Seiryaku Simulation: Inbou no Wakusei: Shancara
Super Mogura Tataki!! Pokkun Mogura (requires peripheral)
Shounen Majutsushi Indy (unreleased)

Mega Drive
Dahna: Megami Tanjō

Super Famicom/SNES
The Rocketeer (developed by NovaLogic)
Naki no Ryū: Mahjong Hishō-den
Aliens vs. Predator (developed by Jorudan, published by Activision internationally)
Burai: Hachigyoku no Yuushi Densetsu

PC Engine/TurboGrafx-16
 Tricky Kick (titled Tricky in Japan)
 Sindibad: Chitei no Daimakyuu
 Sinistron (titled Violent Soldier in Japan)
 Sonic Spike (titled World Beach Volley in Japan)
 Cyber Core (published by NEC in America)

PC Engine CD
 Mateki Densetsu Astralius
 IQ Panic

Video game companies of Japan
Video game publishers
Video game development companies